Good Morning, Little Countess (Spanish:Buenos días, condesita) is a 1967 Spanish musical comedy film directed by Luis César Amadori and starring Rocío Dúrcal, Vicente Parra and Gracita Morales. A man hires a woman to pretend to be a countess and pose as his girlfriend to impress his visiting parents.

Cast
 Rocío Dúrcal as María  
 Vicente Parra 
 Gracita Morales 
 Paquito Cano 
 Aurora Redondo 
 Ana María Custodio 
 Carlos Casaravilla 
 Antonio Riquelme 
 Luis Morris 
 Rafael Bardem 
 Pilar Gómez Ferrer 
 Juan Antonio Riquelme
 Jesús Guzmán 
 Fernando Nogueras
 Nicolás D. Perchicot 
 Josefina Serratosa 
 Miguel Armario 
 Valentín Tornos 
 Pilar Bardem 
 Pilar Gómez Redondo

References

Bibliography
 Peter Cowie & Derek Elley. World Filmography: 1967. Fairleigh Dickinson University Press, 1977.

External links 

1967 films
1967 musical comedy films
1960s Spanish-language films
Films directed by Luis César Amadori
Spanish musical comedy films
1960s Spanish films